Lasse Nis-Hansen Kronborg (born 3 April 1986) is a Danish former professional footballer who played as a midfielder. He has previously represented Vejle Boldklub and HB Køge in the Superliga. He played eight games and scored two goals for various Danish youth national teams from 2003 to 2004.

Career
Kronborg made his senior debut with Vejle Boldklub in April 2004. He played 35 league games and scored two goals for the club, including two Superliga games in the 2006–07 season. He asked to have his Vejle contract terminated in April 2007, the day after his 21st birthday. He continued playing amateur football with Hedensted IF, who had just qualified for the Jutland Series. He played his first match for the new club in April 2007. In June 2007, he returned to professional football, as he signed with Herfølge BK, later known as HB Køge. Kronborg returned to the Superliga with HB Køge for the 2009–10 season.

References

External links

Living people
1986 births
Danish men's footballers
Vejle Boldklub players
Hedensted IF players
Vejle Boldklub Kolding players
HB Køge players
FC Fredericia players
Danish Superliga players
Danish 1st Division players
People from Silkeborg
Association football midfielders
Sportspeople from the Central Denmark Region